Carlos Andrés Calvo Beristain (born 2 December 1992) is a former Mexican professional footballer who last played for Inter Playa of the Liga Premier de México.

Club career

Toluca
Calvo joined Deportivo Toluca for the Clausura 2017 on loan from Atlante. On 11 February 2018, he made his league debut for the Red Devils against Monterrey.

External links
 
  
 
 
 

1992 births
Living people
Association football fullbacks
Liga MX players
Ascenso MX players
Liga Premier de México players
Atlante F.C. footballers
Atlético Morelia players
C.D. Veracruz footballers
Deportivo Toluca F.C. players
Footballers from Yucatán
Sportspeople from Mérida, Yucatán
Mexican footballers